Setsuri River is a river in Hokkaido, Japan. It joins the Kushiro River. It is the winter habitat of the Japanese crane.

References

Rivers of Hokkaido
Rivers of Japan